The Steven House is located in Eau Claire, Wisconsin. It was added to the National Register of Historic Places in 1982.

History
The house was built for J. D. R. Steven and his wife. It was built in 1909 and designated a historic building by the City of Eau Claire Landmark Commission in 1976.

References

Houses on the National Register of Historic Places in Wisconsin
Houses in Eau Claire, Wisconsin
Purcell and Elmslie buildings
Prairie School architecture in Wisconsin
Houses completed in 1909
National Register of Historic Places in Eau Claire County, Wisconsin